Rothesay Academy is a secondary school in the town of Rothesay on the Isle of Bute.

Feeder schools
Rothesay Academy has 3 associated primary schools: Rothesay Primary School and St. Andrew's Primary in Rothesay and North Bute Primary in Port Bannatyne.

History
The school as an institution first opened in 1870, replacing the earlier Croft Lodge and a church school. The original Victorian building, overlooking Rothesay Bay, was extended and modernised in 1910 and again in 1938. It burned to the ground in 1954 and was replaced by a building of contemporary architecture, which opened in 1959. The present building at Townhead dates from 2007, on a joint campus site with Rothesay Primary School and Argyll College. It is one of a batch of joint campuses constructed around the west of Scotland from 2005 to 2009.

References

External links
 Rothesay Joint Campus

Rothesay, Bute
Secondary schools in Argyll and Bute
Educational institutions established in 1870
School buildings completed in 2007
Isle of Bute
1870 establishments in Scotland